Hackbridge railway station is a railway station at Hackbridge in the London Borough of Sutton in South London. The station is served by Southern and Thameslink. It is in Travelcard Zone 4.

The station platforms can accommodate up to 7 coaches. Where trains are longer than this, selective door opening is used.

Services
Services at Hackbridge are operated by Southern and Thameslink using  and  EMUs.

The typical off-peak service in trains per hour is:
 2 tph to 
 2 tph to  via 
 2 tph to 

During the peak hours, additional services between London Victoria and Epsom also call at the station.

On Saturday evenings (after approximately 18:45) and on Sundays, there is no service south of Dorking to Horsham.

Connections
London Buses routes 151 and 127 serve the station.

References

External links

Railway stations in the London Borough of Sutton
Former London, Brighton and South Coast Railway stations
Railway stations in Great Britain opened in 1868
Railway stations served by Govia Thameslink Railway